The Caloosahatchee National Wildlife Refuge is part of the United States National Wildlife Refuge System, located on the Caloosahatchee River, beneath the I-75 Caloosahatchee Bridge, within the city of North Fort Myers. The  refuge was established on January 1, 1921. It is administered as part of the J. N. "Ding" Darling National Wildlife Refuge Complex.

External links
 National Wildlife Refuge

Protected areas of Lee County, Florida
National Wildlife Refuges in Florida
Protected areas established in 1921